Komberi Mookan is a 1984 Indian Tamil-language film directed by A. Jagannathan. It stars Thyagarajan, Saritha and Urvashi. The film was remade in Telugu as Kala Rudrulu.

Plot 

Mookan, a young boy, lives with his parents in a village. Alavanthar is a wealthy and influential person in the village. He is also a womaniser. One night, he forcibly enters Mookan’s house and rapes his mother and with the help of his henchmen kills and burns his father. His mother initially attempts suicide but changes her mind upon seeing the boy and vows to raise him to be a strong and ethical man who will avenge the injustice committed by Alavanthar.

The boy is made to wear a hair bun on his head as a vow to fulfill the duties of revenge and hence he is given the name komberi mookan. He grows up to become a strong man and his mother on her deathbed informs him about the sins committed by Alavanthar and asks him to take revenge. How he proceeds to do that forms the rest of the story.

Cast 
 Thyagarajan
 Saritha
 Urvashi
Senthamarai
 Jayanthi
 Goundamani
 Thengai Srinivasan
 Delhi Ganesh
Idichapuli Selvaraj
Bindu Ghosh
 Senthil
 S. N. Lakshmi

Soundtrack 
The soundtrack was composed by Ilaiyaraaja. The song "Roja Ondru Mutham Ketkum" is based on "Theeram Thedi Olam Padi" from Unaroo.

References

External links 
 

1980s action drama films
1980s Tamil-language films
1984 films
Films directed by A. Jagannathan
Films scored by Ilaiyaraaja
Indian action drama films
Indian films about revenge
Tamil films remade in other languages